William Singleton Young (April 10, 1790 – September 20, 1827) was a U.S. Representative from Kentucky, brother of Bryan Rust Young and uncle of John Young Brown.

Biography
Young was born near Bardstown, Kentucky. Although he initially studied medicine with a Dr. Bemiss, of Bloomfield, he graduated from the University of Louisville, Louisville, Kentucky, with a law degree. He commenced practice in Bloomfield, Kentucky, and continued in this after moving to Elizabethtown, Kentucky, in 1814. Young owned slaves.

Young was elected to the Nineteenth Congress.
He was reelected to the Twentieth Congress and served from March 4, 1825, until his death in Elizabethtown, on September 20, 1827, before the assembling of the Twentieth Congress.
He was interred in Elizabethtown Cemetery.

See also
List of United States Congress members who died in office (1790–1899)

References

1790 births
1827 deaths
People from Nelson County, Kentucky
National Republican Party members of the United States House of Representatives from Kentucky
Kentucky lawyers
American slave owners
People from Elizabethtown, Kentucky
University of Louisville alumni